GAZ-3307 and GAZ-3309 (nickname GAZon) are fourth-generation Russian trucks produced by the medium-duty Gorky Automobile Plant. The flatbed truck carburetor GAZ-3307 was announced in late 1989, and the turbodiesel truck GAZ-3309 was announced at the end of 1994. 

GAZ-3307 will replace the third-generation truck family GAZ-52/53, which were discontinued in early 1993. These trucks have 4.5 tons carrying capacity and are designed for use on all types of paved roads. The fourth-generation GAZ truck family includes 5-ton diesel truck GAZ-4301 (1984-1995) and 3-ton diesel truck GAZ-3306 (1993-1995). Since 1999, Gorky has offered a 2-3 ton all terrain truck GAZ Sadko (4×4) with a single rear axle and busbar system for centralized control of air pressure in the tires. Since 2005, the company has offered 4-ton all-terrain truck GAZ-33086 "Zemlyak" with a busbar gable rear axle.

History and development of the fourth generation of GAZ trucks (4×2)
In the early 1980s, when designing the truck GAZ-3307 and other models of the fourth generation provided ample unification on sites and aggregated existing production car (the chassis and gasoline power plant, in fact, moved from model GAZ-53-12), reducing the cost of the automobiles while facilitating the maintenance, repair, and operation.

The car received a more spacious, modern double cab, equipped with an efficient ventilation and heating system. This was first applied in the pilot truck GAZ-4301 in 1984. The trials of GAZ-3307 were finished in December 1986.

Unlike their predecessors, these trucks have power steering. Serial production of the 4.5-ton truck GAZ-3307 (4×2) with a carburetor engine ZMZ-511 (modernized ZMZ-53) 125 HP began in late 1989.

In 1992, the GAZ deployed mass production of the 5-ton truck GAZ-4301 6-cylinder air-cooled diesel engine GAZ-542 125 HP. It was manufactured under license from the German company Deutz AG, as well as agricultural truck GAZ-SAZ-4509 on its chassis for operation in the 8.6-tonne tipper lorry convoy GAZ-6008 (truck GAZ-4509 + trailer GKB-8536). With significant structural differences, such as wheels for models 3307 and 4301 are not interchangeable, cars are almost identical in appearance. GAZ-4301 production continued until 1995. A total of 28,158 trucks of GAZ-4301 were produced. 

In 1993, the production of the replacement model GAZ-52 3-ton truck GAZ-3306 4-cylinder air-cooled diesel engine GAZ-544 85 HO started. According to some sources in 1992, the truck was released in a limited edition of 2.5 ton modification 33061 with carburetor engine from GAZ-52. The production of three-ton GAZ-3306 (mainly in the performance of "Cargo Taxi") continued until 1995.

In late 1994, with the development of the four issue at GAZ diesel turbo air cooling GAZ-5441 115 HP, the model GAZ-3309 with a carrying capacity 4.5 ton, completely unified the chassis and cab with GAZ-3307. By mid-1996, it was completely replaced with a conveyor truck carburetor 3307. In mid-199, its own production of diesel " air-vent " at GAZ was considered uneconomical, resulting in release of the model 3309, which was further suspended until the end of 2001, and the production of 4.5-thin carburetor GAZ-3307 was restored. Subsequently, gas replaced Belarusian diesels MMZ D-245.7 at the Minsk Motor Plant (MMZ), and the production of the 3309 model resumed.

Since 1999, GAZ produced the fourth family truck which was a four-wheel drive (4×4) car - the GAZ Sadko for the army (capacity 2 tons) and its civilian (2.3 m) version.

Around 2006, GAZ-3307, GAZ-3309, and GAZ-3308 installed petrol and diesel engines certified Euro-2 for environmental standards, and Euro-3 since 2008. Large scale production of 3307 and 3308 models with petrol engines ZMZ was discontinued in 2009; however, restricted production continued for government agencies. In 2010–2012, medium-duty trucks GAZ (4×2) diesel engine was fitted with a predominantly MMZ D-245.7 E-3 (model 3309), and all-wheel drive (4×4) Model 33081 "Sadko" and 33086 "Countryman" - diesel engine MMZ D-245.7 E-2. Since 2013, all trucks of the GAZ 4- generation received the turbo MMZ D-245.7 E-4 power 119 HP as the base engine.

Since 2012, the GAZ-33096 was modified for diesel and was certified under Euro-4 in 2013. In February 2013, the GAZ-33098 series was modified with the Russian diesel engine YaMZ-5342.10 having Euro-4 certification, as well as a new version of the truck, the all-terrain vehicle GAZ-33088 was introduced. In June 2014 GAZ presented a new version, with the unofficial name of Sadko Next with an increased carrying capacity of 3 tons, and also the new version of GAZ-3309.

Models

 GAZ-33070  chassis and flatbed truck with a carburetor engine ZMZ-511/-513/-5233;
 GAZ-33072  chassis with carburetor engine ZMZ-511/-513/-5233 under tippers production SAZ;
 GAZ-33073  cargo taxi (box with awning, folding benches along the sides, the door to the back board and folding stairs);
 GAZ-33074  extended chassis with carburetor engine ZMZ-513/-5234 under mounting KAvZ-3976 (discontinued in late 2007);
 GAZ-33075  chassis and flatbed truck with Bi-fuel engine ZMZ-513 for liquefied petroleum gas (LPG) and gasoline A-80;
 GAZ-33076  chassis and flatbed truck with Bi-fuel engine ZMZ-513 to run on compressed natural gas (CNG) and gasoline A-80;
 GAZ-33078  chassis and flatbed truck with a diesel Hino W04CT 125 hp;
 GAZ-33090  chassis and flatbed turbodiesel MMZ D-245.7E2;
 GAZ-33091  extended by 1.4 m and a flatbed truck chassis with a turbodiesel MMZ D-245.7E2;
 GAZ-33092  chassis with double cab for 7 persons and turbodiesel MMZ D-245.7E2 under fire engines and superstructures;
 GAZ-33094  extended chassis with a turbodiesel MMZ D-245.7E2 under mounting KAvZ-397650;
 SAZ-3507-01  three-way tipper chassis GAZ-33072, volume of body 5 m³ (10 m³ with extended sides), load capacity 4.13 m (4.33 m);
 SAZ-35071  three-way tipper chassis GAZ-3309, volume of body 5 m³ (10 m³ with extended sides), load capacity 3.93 m (4.13 m);
 SAZ-35072  tipper trucks with unilateral chassis GAZ-33072, body capacity 4.5 m³, Capacity 4.25 m;
 SAZ-35072-10  three-way tipper chassis GAZ-3309, volume of body 4.5 m³, load capacity of 4.1 tons;
 GAZ-33098  flatbed truck chassis with a turbodiesel YaMZ-5344 (Euro 4) capacity of 134.5 hp;
 GAZ-33096  flatbed truck with a diesel engine Cummins ISF 3.8L (similar mounted on a truck GAZ-33106 "Valdai").

Since 2000, the GAZ-3307 and 3309 have been used by various companies to create truck variations with extended frames for mounting vans, hauling cars, and moving other machinery. An increase in the size of the mounting frame is fully utilized by increasing the effective length and scope of the body, which is beneficial for transporting long and bulk cargoes. Some variations featured an elongated cabin with berth for intercity traffic.

References

External links

 Official page on the GAZ website
 Configurator in the GAZ website

Pickup trucks
GAZ Group trucks
Trucks of the Soviet Union
Vehicles introduced in 1989